Graham Ritchie (born 23 September 1998) is a Canadian cross-country skier. Ritchie trains as part of the National Team Development Centre Thunder Bay team.

Career
Graham trained with the National Training Development Centre (NTDC) in Thunder Bay, Ontario, while beginning a career in the outdoors industry as a sales representative and equipment technician at Rollin' Thunder Bike, Board, and Ski. 

Ritchie made his World Cup debut in 2019 at the World Cup Finals in Quebec City.

During the 2020–21 FIS Cross-Country World Cup's Ulricehamn stop, Ritchie had a career best 17th-place finish in the freestyle sprint event.

At the FIS Nordic World Ski Championships 2021, Ritchie, along with partner Antoine Cyr, placed in seventh place during the team sprint event. They were the youngest team in the final.

On January 13, 2022, Ritchie was officially named to Canada's 2022 Olympic team.

Cross-country skiing results
All results are sourced from the International Ski Federation (FIS).

Olympic Games

World Championships

World Cup

Season standings

References

External links
 

1998 births
Living people
Canadian male cross-country skiers
Sportspeople from Parry Sound, Ontario
Cross-country skiers at the 2022 Winter Olympics
Olympic cross-country skiers of Canada